Cholendra Shumsher Jung Bahadur Rana is a former chief justice of Nepal. He is the 29th Chief Justice of the Supreme Court of Nepal. He has been appointed by President on the recommendation of Constitutional Council of Nepal and oathed by Bidhya Devi Bhandari, President of Nepal on 2 January 2019.

Career

Awards
Maha Ujwaol Rastradeep awards from the President of Nepal in 2021

See also
 Chief Justice of Nepal
 Deepak Raj Joshee
 Gopal Prasad Parajuli

References

External links
 Supreme Court of Nepal

Living people
Justices of the Supreme Court of Nepal
1957 births
Nepalese Hindus
Chief justices of Nepal
Nepal Law Campus alumni